The Lox Yeo is a short river in North Somerset, England.

The river flows through a gap in the Mendip Hills between Crook Peak and Bleadon Hill, through which the M5 motorway now runs.

The river was once known simply as the Lox.  The name appears to be of Celtic origin, and means either "winding stream" or "bright one".

References

Rivers of Somerset
North Somerset
Somerset Levels
1LoxYeo